Cross Hill is a hamlet in  Derbyshire, England. It is located two miles south of Ripley. Technically speaking, it is actually within Codnor's limits.

Hamlets in Derbyshire
Geography of Amber Valley